Samish Island is an unincorporated community in Skagit County, Washington, United States.  It lies on an island  with the same name, which is located off the northwest coast of the Washington mainland. It is connected to the mainland by land reclaimed through a system of dikes created in the early 20th century.

Samish Island was part of the ancestral homelands of, and was named after, the Samish Indians, a Coast Salish tribe of the Pacific Northwest.

External links
Samish Island Home Page

Unincorporated communities in Skagit County, Washington
Unincorporated communities in Washington (state)
Islands of Washington (state)
Islands of Skagit County, Washington
Islands of Puget Sound
Washington placenames of Native American origin